Minnesota Amendment 1 (also called Minnesota Marriage Amendment or Minnesota Gay Marriage Amendment) was a legislatively referred constitutional amendment proposed to ban marriage between same-sex couples in the state of Minnesota, that appeared on the ballot on November 6, 2012. It was rejected by 51.90% of voters.

Legislative approval
On May 11, 2011, the Minnesota Senate passed a bill to place a proposed amendment to the state constitution on the ballot that would ban same-sex marriage. The vote was 37–27, with all Republicans and one Democrat voting for the amendment. An identical bill was passed by the House on May 21; the vote was 70–62 with two Democrats and all but four Republicans voting for the amendment. The proposed amendment was on the ballot on November 6, 2012. The proposed amendment read: "Only a union of one man and one woman shall be valid or recognized as a marriage in Minnesota." It did not refer to civil unions or domestic partnerships. The question being presented to voters on the ballot read: "Shall the Minnesota Constitution be amended to provide that only a union of one man and one woman shall be valid or recognized as a marriage in Minnesota?"

Support and opposition

In March 2012, Minnesota's Roman Catholic bishops had an audience with Pope Benedict XVI, who told them that preserving the traditional definition of marriage was a priority. Roman Catholic Archbishop John Nienstedt of St. Paul and Minneapolis organized leaders of different religious denominations in support of the amendment and committed his own church to spend $650,000 on behalf of its passage. In September he joined other religious leaders in a demonstration in support of the amendment at the State Capitol. The Minnesota Catholic Conference Marriage Defense Fund contributed more than half the $1.2 million raised by Minnesota for Marriage, the principal organization supporting the amendment, including $130,000 from the Knights of Columbus, a national Catholic organization.

Immediately after the Minnesota legislature voted to put Amendment 1 on the ballot, Outfront Minnesota and Project 515, two groups working for LGBT rights in the state, formed Minnesotans United for All Families – the main campaign organization that would work to defeat the amendment.  Over the course of a year and a half, Minnesotans United would raise and spend over $12 million, more than double the pro-amendment side.  More importantly, the Minnesotans United campaign formed a coalition group of allies with almost 700 member organizations that included political parties, labor unions, veterans, civic groups and businesses like General Mills.  The board and staff of the campaign reflected the same kind of diversity as its coalition partners and even included prominent Republicans. Drawing on lessons learned from past campaigns in other states, Minnesotans United did not cede the religious ground – it hired a faith director to reach out to communities of faith, and more than 100 of its coalition members were churches and other faith groups from around the state.

The centerpiece of the Minnesotans United for All Families campaign became its huge grassroots effort to have conversations with the voters about marriage.  Rather than focus on equal rights and fairness, as was done in previous campaigns, Minnesotans United and its thousands of volunteers, had personal conversations over the phones and face to face about how marriage had the same importance and meaning for both straight and same-sex couples. This messaging strategy, which was also used in the campaign's ad campaign, helped move conflicted voters and resulted in Minnesota being the first state, after 30 attempts, to defeat a constitutional amendment banning same-sex marriage. Minnesotans United is likely the biggest grassroots campaign in the state's history, having had 27,000 volunteers knock on over 400,000 doors and make over 900,000 phone calls in the final eight days of the campaign

The Minnesota arm of President Obama's presidential re-election campaign announced his opposition to this proposed constitutional amendment in April.  Advertisements in opposition to the amendment also featured Minnesota Vikings football player Chris Kluwe.

Opinion polls
Various public opinion surveys of Minnesota residents have asked questions regarding same-sex marriage. The questions vary, with some surveys referring directly to proposed Amendment and others asking more general questions.

Results

County breakdown

See also

 Recognition of same-sex unions in Minnesota
 LGBT rights in Minnesota
 Baker v. Nelson
 Maine Question 1, 2012 
 Maryland Question 6 
 Washington Referendum 74

References

External links
SF1308: Constitutional amendment to recognize marriage solely between one man and one woman
 Minnesotans United for All Families (opposition)
 Minnesota For Marriage (support)
 Who is funding the marriage amendment fight?, MinnPost
 MNopedia: Minnesota Amendment 1

LGBT rights in Minnesota
2012 in LGBT history
Same-sex marriage ballot measures in the United States
2012 Minnesota elections
2012 ballot measures
Minnesota ballot measures